Live at the Palladium may refer to:

 Live at the Palladium (Elkie Brooks album), 2000 Elkie Brooks album
 Live at the Palladium (The Carpenters album), released in 1976 by The Carpenters
 Live at the Palladium, 2004 Disco Biscuits DVD
 Live at the Palladium (Turin Brakes album), 2005 Turin Brakes album
 Live at the Palladium (Bad Religion DVD), 2006 Bad Religion DVD
 Live at the Palladium, 2004 The Divine Comedy DVD

See also
 Live at the London Palladium, 1977 Marvin Gaye album
 Live at the Hollywood Palladium, December 15, 1988, 1991 Keith Richards album